Zrinska is a village in the municipality Veliki Grđevac, Bjelovar-Bilogora County in Croatia. According to the 2001 census, there are 153 inhabitants in 72 family households.

References 

Populated places in Bjelovar-Bilogora County